Zhao Zhongxin (born September 1949) is a retired lieutenant general (zhong jiang) of the People's Liberation Army Air Force (PLAAF) of China. He served as Chief of Staff and then Deputy Commander of the PLAAF.

Biography
Zhao Zhongxin was born in September 1949 in Jiaxiang County, Shandong Province.

He served as deputy regimental commander of the 57th Regiment of the PLAAF 19th Fighter Division, and then division commander. He was commander of the Dalian Air Base (2000), and then chief of staff for Chengdu Military Region AF (October 2002) and Nanjing Military Region Air Force (July 2003). He became deputy chief of staff of the PLAAF in 2004 and chief of staff of the PLAAF in 2005. He was appointed Deputy Commander of the PLAAF in 2007. Yang Guohai succeeded him as chief of staff. As one of several PLAAF deputy commanders, Zhao was in charge of headquarters affairs and air force military region affairs.

Zhao attained the rank of major general in 2000, and lieutenant general in July 2007.

References

1949 births
Living people
People's Liberation Army Air Force generals
People's Liberation Army generals from Shandong
People from Jining